The St. John the Baptist Chapel is a historic Russian Orthodox chapel in Naknek, Alaska, United States.  It is traditionally said to have been built in 1886 and enlarged in 1914.  It is a simple single story wood-frame building.  It consists of a single chamber, measuring 10'3"' wide and 30'3" long, which houses the nave and altar, and a small vestibule.  Analysis of the construction indicates that the vestibule and a portion of the nave were constructed after the original construction date.  The gable roof is topped by a centrally-placed Russian Orthodox cross, and there is a bell mounted on a metal framework outside the vestibule.

The chapel was listed on the National Register of Historic Places in 1980.

See also
National Register of Historic Places listings in Bristol Bay Borough, Alaska

References

Bristol Bay Borough, Alaska
Buildings and structures completed in 1914
Churches on the National Register of Historic Places in Alaska
Buildings and structures on the National Register of Historic Places in Bristol Bay Borough, Alaska
Russian Orthodox chapels